The World Long Drive Championship is an annual long drive competition in the sport of golf. It was first held in 1974, and since 2000 has comprised Open, Masters (over-45s) and Women's events. 

From 1995 to 2015, the events were owned and produced by Long Drivers of America.  In 2016 the Golf Channel took control of the World Long Drive Championship under the World Long Drive Association.  The Golf Channel stopped producing World Long Drive Association events in 2020. A new organization called the Professional Long Drivers Association has since been founded and took over the championship, initially called the National Long Drive Championship because of restrictions in 2020, and since returning to the World Championship name in 2021.

Canadian Jason Zuback is the most successful competitor with five wins in the Open division, including four in a row between 1996 and 1999, and one in the Masters division. Swede Sandra Carlborg is the most successful female competitor, with five titles in the Women's division since 2011.

Format and rules 
Golfers are required to use a USGA-approved club with a maximum length of 48 inches. In each round, competitors have three minutes to hit eight golf balls; to be counted as a scoring shot, the ball must land in "the grid", a range that varies from 45 to 60 yards wide and 420-450 yards long. Competitors progress through group-stages to reach the final 16, which is conducted as a single-elimination tournament.

History

1974–85: The early years 
Some of the early events were held in conjunction with the PGA Championship each year, with the long drive championship being contested a day or two before the PGA's opening round.

Jim Dent won the first two events in 1974 and 1975. Evan "Big Cat" Williams won the next two events in 1976 and 1977. Andy Franks became the third two-time winner, capturing his second title in 1982 after also winning in 1979. Players from the PGA Tour often participated in some of the early long drive championships, with veteran Tour player Lon Hinkle winning the event in 1981. Of note was the creativity of 1984 champion Larry "Wedgy" Winchester who used an unconventionally long 60-inch club to register a winning drive of 319 yards and finish ahead of touring pros Hinkle and Payne Stewart, who finished second and third. Scott DeCandia won the first of his two titles in 1980.

1986–95: Parity 
The next decade of the long drive event featured nine different champions, with only Art Sellinger managing two titles in the 10-year span (1986, 1991). DeCandia won his second title in this span with the others all being first-time champions. Sean Fister closed out this 10-year period in 1995 with the first of what would be three long drive titles for him. The longest recorded winning drive in this 10-year stretch was Darryl Anderson's 345-yard shot in 1994 but that still fell short of Williams' then-record winning drive of 353 yards in 1977.

1996–2006: The Jason Zuback era 
Zuback became the first player since Williams in the inaugural two events to win consecutive championships. In fact, Zuback won four straight from 1996-99. He later added a record fifth title (since tied in the women's division by Sandra Carlborg) in 2006. Zuback also was the first to crack the 400-yard barrier with a winning drive of 412 yards in his second win in 1997. The former pharmacist also received a $50,000 first-place check for the 1997 victory, the first winner to eclipse that amount. After his four straight titles and a runner-up finish in 2000, Zuback was inducted into the Alberta Sports Hall of Fame. Clayton Burger became the second to top the 400-yard mark with his winning shot of 402 yards in 2003. Fister added his second and third championship belts with wins in 2001 and 2005, joining Zuback as the only men to win three or more titles. Former Big Ten champion javelin thrower Carl Wolter (Penn State) won the first of his two titles in 2002 in a major upset, having just taken up the game of golf three months prior to the event.

2007–19: 400 plus yards becomes the norm 
The 400-yard mark was topped by eight champions in the next 11 years with Justin James establishing a tournament-record mark of 435 yards in capturing the 2017 championship.  James' record-breaking drive turned out to be much more than he needed.  After his finals competitor missed the grid on all eight of his drives, James only needed to keep one in play at a minimum distance of 270 yards. He easily topped that distance and set the record for the longest winning drive in the tournament's 42-year history. This 11-year time frame also featured four two-time winners with Jamie Sadlowski going back-to-back in 2008 and 2009, Joe Miller winning in 2010 and 2016, former University of Miami baseball pitcher Tim Burke in 2013 and 2015  and most recently Kyle Berkshire claiming the final World Long Drive Association title in 2019.  In addition, Wolter won his second title in 2011. First-time winners in this time period also included Mike Dobbyn in 2007, Ryan Winther in 2012, Jeff Flagg in 2014 and Maurice Allen in 2018.

2020-present:  The PLDA is Formed and a Major Winner Joins 
During the global pandemic in 2020, Comcast shuts down the World Long Drive Association (WLD) and cancels the World Long Drive Championship.  Long drivers, with coach Bobby Peterson and a number of professionals, form the charter for a new sanctioning body, the Professional Long Drivers Association (PLDA).  The initial PLDA events in 2020 are held in Peterson's North Carolina coaching facility, with the PLDA forming its first season finale in Memphis, the PLDA National Championship.  Kyle Berkshire repeats his end-of-season championship title in Memphis for 2020.  The event is upgraded to World Championship status in 2021, where 2020 U.S. Open champion Bryson DeChambeau joins the investor group that jointly owns the PLDA.  Berkshire repeats in 2021 as the PLDA championship winner.    

Berkshire is eliminated in the Round of 16 at the 2022 championship, where Martin Borgmeier defeated Bryson DeChambeau, 426-406, in the final.

Winners 

1974 – Jim Dent, 324 yards
1975 – Jim Dent, 317 yards
1976 – Evan Williams, 307 yards
1977 – Evan Williams, 353 yards
1978 – John McComish, 330 yards
1979 – Andy Franks, 314 yards
1980 – Scott DeCandia, 295 yards
1981 – Lon Hinkle, 338 yards
1982 – Andy Franks, 346 yards
1983 – Terry Forcum, 307 yards
1984 – Wedgy Winchester, 319 yards
1985 – Dennis Paulson, 323 yards
1986 – Art Sellinger, 311 yards
1987 – Joe Walsh, 314 yards
1988 – Jim Maynard, 334 yards
1989 – Scott DeCandia, 327 yards
1990 – Frank Miller, 328 yards
1991 – Art Sellinger, 326 yards
1992 – Monte Scheinblum 329 yards
1993 – Brian Pavlet, 336 yards
1994 – Darryl Anderson, 345 yards
1995 – Sean Fister, 362 yards
1996 – Jason Zuback Canada 351 yards
1997 – Jason Zuback Canada 412 yards
1998 – Jason Zuback Canada 361 yards
1999 – Jason Zuback Canada 376 yards
2000 – Viktor Johansson Sweden 315 yards
2001 – Sean Fister USA 376 yards
2002 – Carl Wolter USA  384 yards
2003 – Clayton Burger USA  402 yards
2004 – David Mobley USA  377 yards
2005 – Sean Fister USA  377 yards
2006 – Jason Zuback USA  368 yards
2007 – Mike Dobbyn USA 385 yards
2008 – Jamie Sadlowski Canada 418 yards
2009 – Jamie Sadlowski Canada 384 yards
2010 – Joe Miller UK 414 yards
2011 – Carl Wolter USA  409 yards
2012 – Ryan Winther USA  343 yards
2013 – Tim Burke USA  427 yards
2014 – Jeff Flagg USA  365 yards
2015 – Tim Burke USA  394 yards
2016 – Joe Miller UK 423 yards
2017 – Justin James 435 yards
2018 – Maurice Allen USA  393 yards
2019 – Kyle Berkshire 406 yards
2020 - Kyle Berkshire 383 yards (PLDA National Championship, first under new sanctioning body)
2021 – Kyle Berkshire 422 yards (PLDA World Championship, first full season of PLDA)
2022 -   Martin Borgmeier  426 yards

Masters winners 

 1996 – Michael Hooper 333 yards
 1997 – Michael Hooper 371 yards
 1998 – Michael Hooper 354 yards
 1999 – Fred Hooter 352 yards
 2000 – Mike Gorton 310 yards
 2001 – Ted Fostey 357 yards
 2002 – Pat Dempsey USA  342 yards
 2003 – Eric Jones USA  381 yards
 2004 – Bobby Wilson 360 yards
 2005 – Gerry James 366 yards
 2006 – Gerry James 378 yards
 2007 – Frank Miller 394 yards
 2008 – Dan Boever 366 yards
 2009 – Bobby Wilson 374 yards
 2010 – George Slupski 389 yards
 2011 – David Mobley 459 yards
 2012 – Eric Lastowka USA 355 yards 
 2013 – Stephen Kennedy 369 yards
 2014 – Jeff Gavin (Canada) 384 yards
 2015 – Jason Zuback 339 yards
 2016 – Tom Peppard USA  347 yards
 2017 – Jeff Crittenden 363 yards
 2018 – Eddie Fernandes
 2019 – Jeff Crittenden
 2020 - Mile Bauman 343 yards  PLDA National Championship
 2021 – Jeff Gavin 361 yards PLDA World Championship
 2022 - Eddie Fernandes 411 yards

Womens winners 

 2000 – Stacey Shinnick 249 yards
 2001 – Lee Brandon 291 yards
 2002 – Stacey Shinnick 292 yards
 2003 – Nancy Abiecunas 332 yards
 2004 – Sally Dee 287 yards
 2005 – Stacey Shinnick 311 yards
 2006 – Phillis Meti 326 yards
 2007 – Sheila Kelliher 329 yards
 2008 – Lana Lawless 245 yards
 2009 – N/A
 2010 – N/A
 2011 – Sandra Carlborg 285 yards
 2012 – Sandra Carlborg 339 yards
 2013 – Heather LeMaster 306 yards
 2014 – Sandra Carlborg 332 yards
 2015 – Sandra Carlborg 321 yards
 2016 – Phillis Meti 310 yards
 2017 – Sandra Carlborg 320 yards
2018 – Phillis Meti 317 yards
2019 – Chloe Garner 347 yards
 2021 – Kanani Lodge 332 yards
 2022 - Sara Owada 776 yards cumulative, 258.7 yard average (best three shots format)

References

Golf tournaments
Recurring sporting events established in 1974